Akua'ba (sometimes spelled Akwaba or Akuba) are wooden ritual fertility dolls from Southern Ghana and nearby areas. The best known akua'ba are those of the Fanti people, “Fanti Dolls” whose akua'ba have large, disc-like heads. Other tribes in the West Africa region (f.ex. Kru and Igbo people) have their own distinctive style of akua'ba.

Traditionally, these dolls are carried on the back of young women either hoping to conceive a child, or to ensure the attractiveness of the child being carried. When not in active use, the akua'ba would be ritually washed and cared for in the traditional homestead. The treatment of the Akua'ba has been described as an example of traditional beliefs that corresponds to many traditional beliefs in West African sympathetic magic.

The Fanti/Fante are part of the Akan group of ethnicities of Ghana and Ivory Coast, who all have matrilinear lineages. The majority of their sculpture reflects their concern with fertility and children, and
they are known best for their fertility dolls and maternity figures.
Many Akan peoples make no great distinctions between Akuaba
fertility images and figures of different configuration, size or
material. Most figures are called Akuaba; there are also many
small figures without "classic" Akuaba form but which are
nevertheless used in identical or analogous situations. Their shrine
sculptures are almost always female. All shrines are concerned
either directly or indirectly with human fertility. Among the smaller
sculptures is a chalk-whitened one which recalls the common
practice of affecting powder-white skins for special days of worship
and festivals to show reverence and devotion. Many cult images
are similarly painted white. Standing female sculptures are
sometimes carved with a child, but more commonly without. The
standing female icon common in West African sculpture has various
interpretations. In this example poise, dignity, and stability are the
keynotes

Today, one is more likely to see a mass-produced akua'ba or “Fante Doll” for sale as a work of art or souvenir rather than an heirloom in ritual use. Traditional use does, however, continue in some Fan tree and other Akan areas. The form of the akua'ba has also gained currency as a general symbol of good luck.

Akuaba or Fante Dolls were known to have been taken to the Americas by some enslaved Africans. They are known to have been carried by slave mothers as little deities and as a connection to their ancestral homeland of Africa.

They were also secretly carried as good luck charms. Many enslaved mothers passed it to their children whenever they were separated, removed and sold from their mothers on a plantation.

Fante dolls were highly sought after by Europeans who came to Africa especially during the 1800s. They became popular in many museums in Europe.

Other African tribes had their own version of many different types of wood carving for use in various rituals. However, Fante culture was unique in its dedication of these beautifully carved artifacts solely for procreation, protection of families and good luck in their homesteads.

See also
 African dolls
 Ankh

References

External links
 An akuaba from the Metropolitan Museum of Art's collection, with description

Traditional dolls
Ghanaian culture
African art
Wooden dolls